Ulen Historic District, also known as Country Club Addition, is a national historic district located at Ulen, Boone County, Indiana.  The district encompasses 53 contributing buildings, 2 contributing sites, 1 contributing structure, and 4 contributing objects in an upscale suburban area near Indianapolis and next to the Ulen Country Club and golf course.  The golf course was the first designed by Bill Diddel.  The district developed between about 1924 and 1963, and includes representative examples of Colonial Revival, Tudor Revival, Mediterranean Revival, and Ranch Style architecture.

It was listed on the National Register of Historic Places in 2015.

References

Historic districts on the National Register of Historic Places in Indiana
Colonial Revival architecture in Indiana
Tudor Revival architecture in Indiana
Geography of Boone County, Indiana
Historic districts in Boone County, Indiana
National Register of Historic Places in Boone County, Indiana